Malaza is a genus of skippers in the family Hesperiidae.

Species
Malaza carmides (Hewitson, 1868)
Malaza empyreus (Mabille, 1878)
Malaza fastuosus (Mabille, 1884)

References

External links
Natural History Museum Lepidoptera genus database
Seitz, A. Die Gross-Schmetterlinge der Erde 13: Die Afrikanischen Tagfalter. Plate XIII 77

Erionotini
Hesperiidae genera